My Prison Yard is a 2008 Spanish prison drama film directed by Belén Macías. The female-dominated cast stars Candela Peña and Verónica Echegui alongside Ana Wagener, Blanca Portillo, Patricia Reyes Spíndola and Violeta Pérez.

Plot 
A prison drama set in the 1980s, the plot tracks a group of female inmates who create a theatre group with help from a female prison officer, Mar.

Cast

Production 
An El Deseo and Warner Bros. Entertainment España production, My Prison Yard began filming began on 8 October 2007. Shooting lasted for 8 weeks, taking place in between the Madrid region and the province of Guadalajara.

Release 
The film was presented on 22 September 2008 at the Kursaal as part of the main competition of the 56th San Sebastián International Film Festival (SSIFF).

Reception 
Irene Crespo of Cinemanía gave the film 3 out of 5 stars, considering that while not a promise of thematic renewal for Spanish cinema, the film seems to be a firm commitment to tell the social stories with renewed impetus.

Jay Weissberg of Variety considered the film an "ultra-straight" drama, taking "the prize for most earnest and least self-aware women-in-prison film of the decade, if not longer", assessing that while never rising above TV movie material the female cast pulled solid and genuinely sympathetic performances.

Accolades 

|-
| align = "center" rowspan = "8" | 2009 || 64th CEC Medals || Best Actress || Verónica Echegui ||  || 
|-
| rowspan = "4" | 23rd Goya Awards || Best New Director || Belén Macías ||  || rowspan = "4" | 
|-
| Goya Award for Best Actress || Verónica Echegui || 
|-
| Goya Award for Best New Actress || Ana Wagener || 
|-
| Goya Award for Best Original Song || "Podemos volar juntos"by Raul Sánchez Zafra, Juan Pablo  || 
|-
| rowspan = "3" | 18th Actors and Actresses Union Awards || Best Film Actress in a Secondary Role || Ana Wagener ||  || rowspan = "3" | 
|-
| Best Film Actress in a Minor Role || Natalia Mateo || 
|-
| Best New Actress || Violeta Pérez ||  
|}

See also 
 List of Spanish films of 2008

References 

Films shot in the Community of Madrid
Films shot in the province of Guadalajara
2000s Spanish-language films
Spanish drama films
2000s prison drama films
Films set in the 1980s
2008 drama films
El Deseo films
2000s Spanish films
Spanish prison films
Women in prison films